Liang Yanfen (born 26 September 2000) is a Chinese Paralympic athlete. She won the bronze medal in the women's 100 metres T12 event at the 2020 Summer Paralympics held in Tokyo, Japan. She also competed in the women's 200 metres T12 event.

References

External links
 

Living people
2000 births
Chinese female sprinters
Athletes (track and field) at the 2020 Summer Paralympics
Medalists at the 2020 Summer Paralympics
Paralympic athletes of China
Paralympic bronze medalists for China
Paralympic medalists in athletics (track and field)
Female competitors in athletics with disabilities
Paralympic athletes with a vision impairment
People from Nanhai District
Runners from Guangdong
21st-century Chinese women
Chinese blind people